KCB Bank Rwanda was a commercial bank in Rwanda and a subsidiary of Kenyan KCB Group. It was one of the banks licensed by the National Bank of Rwanda, the country's banking regulator.

As of June 2015, KCB Rwanda was a medium-sized financial service provider, with estimated total assets of about US$190.2 million (RWF:140 billion) and shareholders' equity of approximately US$16.3 million (RWF:12 billion).

History
In December 2008, KCB Rwanda commenced banking services in Kigali, following licensing by the National Bank of Rwanda. Since then, the bank has opened fourteen (14) branches in the country. KCB Rwanda is a 100% subsidiary of the KCB Group.

Following the Acquisition of BPR by KCB Group, KCB Rwanda was merged into Banque Populaire du Rwanda to form BPR Bank Rwanda Plc, making it the country's second largest bank.

Branch network
, KCB Rwanda has a network of fourteen (14) branches across the country. Among the locations where the bank maintains branches are the following:

 Main Branch - Avenue de la Paix, Kigali
 Kimironko Branch — Kimironko, Kigali
 Nyabugogo Branch — Nyabugogo, Kigali
 Remera Branch — Remera, Kigali
 Gisozi Branch — Gisozi, Kigali
 Tropical Plaza Branch — City Centre, Kigali
 Musanze Branch - Musanze
 Rubavu Branch - Rubavu
 Muhanga Branch - Muhanga
 Huye Branch - Huye
 Rusizi Branch - Rusizi
 Kayonza Branch- Kayonza
 Nyarutarama Branch - MTN Centre, Nyarutarama, Kigali

See also

 List of banks in Rwanda
 KCB Group
 Kenya Commercial Bank
 KCB Sudan
 KCB Tanzania
 KCB Uganda

References

Banks of Rwanda
Banks established in 2008
2008 establishments in Rwanda
KCB Group
Organisations based in Kigali
Economy of Kigali